Carla is the feminized version of Carl, Carlos or Charles, from ceorl in Old English, which means "free man". Notable people with the name include:

 Carla, French singer and former member of the children's music group Kids United
 Carla Abellana, Filipina actress and commercial model
 Carla Azar, drummer and singer for the band Autolux
 Carla Barbarino, retired Italian sprinter and hurdler
 Carla Beck, Canadian politician
 Carla Berrocal (born 1983), Spanish comics illustrator
 Carla Berube, American college basketball coach
 Carla Beurskens, prominent long-distance runner from the Netherlands
 Carla Blank, American choreographer, writer, and editor
 Carla Bley, American jazz composer, pianist, organist and bandleader
 Carla Bonner, Australian actress
 Carla Borrego, Jamaican basketball and netball player
 Carla Boyce (born 1998), Scottish footballer
 Carla Boyd, retired Australian basketball player with 2 Olympic medals
 Carla Bozulich, lead singer, lyricist and founder of The Geraldine Fibbers
 Carla Bruni, Italian-French singer, songwriter and former model
 Carla Cassidy, American romance novelist
 Carla Cook, jazz vocalist
 Carla Cortijo, Puerto Rican basketball player
 Carla Cotwright-Williams, African-American mathematician
 Carla Couto, Portuguese football striker
 Carla Cunningham (born 1963), American politician
 Carla Del Poggio, Italian cinema, theatre, and television actress
 Carla Del Ponte, Chief Prosecutor at two United Nations international criminal law tribunals
 Carla Duff, brazilian waxer
 Carla Dunlap, American bodybuilding champion.
 Carla Dziwoki, Australian netball player
Carla J. Easton, Scottish singer-songwriter
 Carla Emery DeLong, American author
 Carla Estrada, Latin American telenovela producer
 Carla Fracci, ballet dancer and actress
 Carla Garapedian, documentary filmmaker
 Carla Gavazzi, Italian operatic soprano
 Carla Geurts, freestyle swimmer
Carla Giuliano, Italian politician
 Carla Gravina, Italian film actress
 Carla Gugino, American actress
 Carla Hall, American chef
 Carla Harryman, American poet, essayist, and playwright
 Carla Anderson Hills, American lawyer
 Carla Howell, President of the Center For Small Government
 Carla Humphries, commercial model and actress in the Philippines
 Carla Jimenez, American television and film actress
 Carla Kelly, American romance writer
 Carla Khan, Pakistan squash player
 Carla Kihlstedt, American violinist, vocalist, and multi-instrumentalist
 Carla Körbes, Brazilian ballet dancer
 Carla Laemmle, American actress
 Carla Lane, pseudonym of Romana Barrack, an English television writer
 Carla Lehmann, Canadian film and television actress
Carla Lockhart (born 1985), British politician
 Carla MacLeod, retired Canadian national women's hockey player
 Carla Marins, Brazilian actress
 Carla McGhee, American basketball player
 Carla Speed McNeil, American science fiction writer, cartoonist, and illustrator
 Carla Mendonça, English actress
 Carla Mercier, environmental physicist and Nobel Prize Recipient
 Carla Molema, Dutch darts player
 Carla Moreno, Brazilian triathlete
 Carla Morrison, Mexican singer, songwriter and guitarist
 Carla Overbeck, American soccer player
Carla Padilla (born 1988), Bolivian footballer
Carla Padilla Ramos (born 1969), Mexican politician
Carla Qualtrough (born 1971), Canadian politician and former paralympian
Carla Quevedo (born 1988), Argentinian actress and designer
Carla Quint (born 1972), Dutch water polo player
 Carla Rahal, Bulgarian actress
 Carla Rebecchi, Olympic bronze medalist in field hockey
 Carla Rhodes, American ventriloquist, comedian and musician
 Carla Rueda Cotito, Peruvian volleyball player
Carla Ruocco (born 1973), Italian politician
 Carla Ryan, professional cyclist from Australia
 Carla Sacramento, middle distance runner from Portugal
 Carla J. Shatz, American neurobiologist
 Carla Sozzani, Italian art dealer
 Carla Stovall, politician and former Attorney General of Kansas
 Carla Suárez Navarro, Spanish tennis player
 Carla Swart, South African cyclist
 Carla Thomas, Queen of Memphis Soul
 Carla Tuzzi, retired Italian hurdler
 Carla Ulbrich, American singer-songwriter, guitarist, and author
 Carla Werner, singer and songwriter from New Zealand
 Carla White, American jazz vocalist
 Carla Witte (1889–1943), German-Uruguayan painter, sculptor, and teacher
 Carla Woodcock (born 1998), English actress
 Carla Yules (born 1996), Indonesian beauty queen
 Carla Zampatti, fashion designer and businesswoman

Fictional characters 
 Carla Rosón, character interpreting a rich girl from the popular Spain TV show, Elite (TV series)
 Carla Connor, character from the British soap opera, Coronation Street
 Carla Crozier, character on the New Zealand soap opera Shortland Street
 Carla Espinosa, character from Scrubs
 Carla Gray, character on One Life to Live
Carla Gunderson, young female Spix's Macaw character from animated movie Rio 2
Carla Mitchell, character from the British soap opera, EastEnders
 Carla Tortelli, waitress on the TV show Cheers
Carla Veloso, Cars series characters Female Auto racing World Grand Prix sports fiction Cars 2 (2011)
 Carla von Lahnstein, character from the German soap opera Verbotene Liebe (Forbidden Love)
Carla Yeager, character from the manga and anime ''Attack on Titan

Other 
Hurricane Carla, Category 4 Atlantic hurricane in 1961

See also 

Calla (name)
Carli (given name)
 Carly (name)
Charla (name)
 Karla (name)
Carlia S. Westcott

References 

Feminine given names